= Paula Cristina Francisco Coelho =

Angolan politician

- Born: Angola
- Occupation: Politician

Paula Cristina Francisco Coelho is an Angolan politician. He is the current Minister of Environment of Angola, as well as a member of parliament. He is the member of MPLA.
